This is a list of noteworthy gaming conventions from around the world. This list is sectioned by location, and each gaming convention includes the dates during which it is typically held. Dates listed are approximate or traditional time periods for each convention.

Multiple locations
 Game Market, location varies
 Knutepunkt, alternating between Norway, Sweden, Denmark and Finland
 MineCon, location varies
 Penny Arcade Expo, annually at several locations in the US, and in Melbourne, Australia
 TwitchCon, semi-annually once in different venues across Europe & once in the US

Asia-Pacific

Australia
 Arcanacon – Melbourne in January 
 AVCon – Adelaide typically in July at various locations
 Melbourne International Games Week – Melbourne, October–November, various locations
 Penny Arcade Expo (PAX) Aus – Melbourne Convention and Exhibition Centre in November
 RTX Australia – International Convention Center in January/February
 Supanova Pop Culture Expo – various dates and locations

Bahrain
 SaikoroWars – Paddock Halls, Bahrain International Circuit, irregularly

China
 ChinaJoy – Shanghai in July
 Penny Arcade Expo GC Play – Guangzhou, China in November

Iraq
 Ziggurat Con – Tallil Airbase, Iraq; premiere of this event and the first con in a combat zone

Japan
 Tokyo Game Show – Tokyo in September

New Zealand
 Armageddon – Auckland, Wellington, Hamilton and Christchurch
 Chimera – Auckland, in November
 KapCon – Wellington, in January
 Wellycon - Wellington, in June

Philippines
 Philippine Game Festival – Manila in October

Saudi Arabia
 Gamers' Day – Riyadh in September

South Korea
 G-Star – Busan in November

Europe

Czech Republic
 Game Developers Session - Prague in November

Denmark
 Fastaval – Århus during Easter
 Nordic Game Jam – Copenhagen in January - February

Finland
 Ropecon – Helsinki in late July
 Assembly - Helsinki in early August (Assembly Summer), and in early February (Assembly Winter)

France
 Festival Ludique International de Parthenay (FLIP) – Parthenay in July
 Paris Games Week (PGW) – Paris in November
 DreamHack – Centre international de congrès de Tours in May

Germany
 Gamescom – Köln in August
 Internationale Spieltage Spiel – Essen in October
 Nuremberg International Toy Fair – Nuremberg in February

Italy
 Lucca Comics & Games – Lucca in early November
 PLAY: The Games Festival – Modena in April
 Hellana Games - Agliana in April

Ireland
 Games Fleadh – LIT Tipperary in late March
 Itzacon Eire – NUI Galway in early March
 Warpcon – University College Cork in late January

Norway
 The Gathering – Hamar during Easter

Poland
 Polcon – on the last weekend of August, location changes every year
 Pyrkon – Poznań in March

Portugal

Lisboa Games Week – in November, in Lisbon

Romania

East European Comic Con

Russia
 IgroMir – Moscow at the end of September
 Russian Game Developers Conference
 Comic-Con Russia

Sweden
 DreamHack – Jönköping & Skellefteå since 1994
 GothCon – Gothenburg during Easter since 1977

United Kingdom
 EGX – Birmingham, England & London, England
 Multiplay's Insomnia Gaming Festival – NEC Birmingham
 UK Games Expo – annual hobby gaming convention held annually at the Hilton, NEC in May/June

North America

Canada
 Calgary Comic and Entertainment Expo (Calgary Expo) – Calgary, Alberta in April
 CanGames – Ottawa, Ontario in May
 Enthusiast Gaming Live Expo – Toronto, Ontario in October
 FallCon – Calgary, Alberta in October
 Fan Expo Canada – Toronto, Ontario in August or September
 Hal-Con – Halifax, Nova Scotia in November
 Montreal International Games Summit (MIGS) – Montreal, Quebec in December
 Pure Speculation – Edmonton, Alberta in November
 VCON – Vancouver, British Columbia in October
 DreamHack – Montreal, Quebec in September

United States
Arranged by regional divisions used by the United States Census Bureau

North East

 Arisia – Boston, Massachusetts in January
 Carnagecon – Killington, Vermont in early November
 ConnectiCon – Hartford, Connecticut in July
 FlightSimCon – New England Air Museum, Windsor Locks, Connecticut in June
 Intercon – Chelmsford, Massachusetts in early March
 Penny Arcade Expo (PAX) East – Boston, Massachusetts in March or April
 PortConMaine – Portland, Maine in late June
 Vericon – Cambridge, Massachusetts in late March

Middle Atlantic
New Jersey, New York, and Pennsylvania
 DexCon – Morristown, New Jersey in July
 Genericon – Troy, New York in February/March
 Historicon – Lancaster, Pennsylvania in July
 I-CON – Long Island, New York at Stony Brook University in March/April
 IndieCade East – Museum of the Moving Image in Queens, New York in February
 Penny Arcade Expo (PAX) Unplugged – Philadelphia, Pennsylvania in December
 PrinceCon – Princeton, New Jersey
 TooManyGames – Oaks, Pennsylvania in June
 World Boardgaming Championships – Seven Springs, Pennsylvania in late July

Midwest

East North Central
Illinois, Indiana, Ohio, Michigan, and Wisconsin
 Archon – Collinsville, Illinois in October
 ConCoction – Cleveland, Ohio in March
 Gary Con – Lake Geneva, Wisconsin in March
 Gen Con – Indianapolis, Indiana in July/August
 Marcon – Columbus, Ohio on Mother's Day weekend
 Marmalade Dog – Kalamazoo, Michigan in the first quarter
 Midwest Gaming Classic – Milwaukee, Wisconsin in April
 Origins Game Fair – Columbus, Ohio in late June
 Penguicon – Troy, Michigan in April
 Winter Fantasy – Fort Wayne, Indiana in January

West North Central
Iowa, Kansas, Minnesota, Missouri, Nebraska, North Dakota, and South Dakota
 DemiCon – Des Moines, Iowa, first weekend each May
 Gamicon – Iowa City, Iowa, in February

South Atlantic
Delaware, District of Columbia, Florida, Georgia, Maryland, North Carolina, South Carolina, Virginia, and West Virginia
 Dragon Con – Atlanta, Georgia on Labor Day weekend
 Historicon – Fredericksburg, Virginia in July
 MAGFest – National Harbor, Maryland, in January
 MegaCon – Orlando, Florida, in May
 MineCon – Orlando, Florida on the 2nd weekend of November (2013; other years may vary)
 MomoCon – Atlanta, Georgia in May
 PrezCon – Charlottesville, Virginia, President's Day weekend
 RavenCon – Richmond, Virginia, in April
 Stellarcon – High Point, North Carolina in March

East South Central
Alabama, Kentucky, Mississippi, and Tennessee
 Chattacon – Chattanooga, Tennessee at the end of January
 CoastCon – Biloxi, Mississippi in early March
 Games Workshop Games Day – Memphis, Tennessee, Tennessee in mid-summer
 Hypericon – Nashville, Tennessee in early summer
 Lexicon Gaming Convention – Lexington, Kentucky in April
 MidSouthCon – Memphis, Tennessee, in March
 MOBICON – Mobile, Alabama in May
 Yama-Con – Pigeon Forge, Tennessee in December

South West Central
Arkansas, Louisiana, Oklahoma, and Texas
 BGG.CON – Irving, Texas in late November
 Comicpalooza – Houston, Texas over Memorial Day weekend in late May
 Penny Arcade Expo (PAX) South – San Antonio, Texas in January
 QuakeCon – Dallas, Texas in early August
 RTX – Austin, Texas in early July
 SXSW – Austin, Texas in mid-March

West

Mountain
Arizona, Colorado, Idaho, Montana, Nevada, New Mexico, Utah, and Wyoming
 Denver Comic Con – Denver, Colorado in June
 Game On Expo – Mesa, Arizona in August
 Phoenix Comic Fest – Phoenix, Arizona in May
 SaltCON – Layton, Utah in March

Pacific
Alaska, California, Hawaii, Oregon, and Washington
 BlizzCon – Anaheim, California in the Autumn
 Dragonflight – Seattle, Washington, second weekend in August
 DunDraCon – San Ramon, California on Presidents' Day weekend in February
 Electronic Entertainment Expo (E3) – Los Angeles, California in June 
 Game Developers Conference – San Francisco, California in March
 GameStorm – Portland, Oregon in March
 GameSoundCon – Los Angeles, California in the Fall
 Gamex – Los Angeles, California on Memorial Day weekend in May
 Gateway – Los Angeles, California on Labor Day weekend in September
 GaymerX – San Francisco, California 
 IndieCade Festival – Los Angeles, California in early October 
 Northwest Pinball and Arcade Show – Seattle, Washington in June
 Norwescon – Seattle, Washington in March/April (Easter weekend)
 OrcCon – Los Angeles, California on Presidents' Day weekend in February
 OryCon – Portland, Oregon in November
 Penny Arcade Expo (PAX) Dev – Seattle, Washington in August
 Penny Arcade Expo (PAX) West – Seattle, Washington on the last weekend in August or Labor Day Weekend
 RadCon – Pasco, Washington on Presidents' Day weekend in February
 SpoCon – Spokane, Washington in August

Latin America

Brazil
 Brasil Game Show (BGS) – São Paulo, São Paulo in October
 Gamercom – Florianópolis, Santa Catarina in July

Mexico
 Electronic Game Show – Mexico City in October

Defunct and on-hiatus conventions
These are notable conventions that have at one time existed, but have either gone on hiatus for more than one year, or have finished operating entirely.

 CONduit – Salt Lake City, Utah, United States
 E for All – Los Angeles, California, United States
 GottaCon – Victoria, British Columbia, Canada
 Trinoc*coN – Raleigh, North Carolina, United States

See also
List of anime conventions
List of comic book conventions
List of multigenre conventions
List of science fiction conventions
List of Worldcons

Notes

References

External links
Fancons.com
VideoGameCons.com